The Ultimate Fighter: Live (also known as The Ultimate Fighter 15) was the fifteenth installment of the Ultimate Fighting Championship (UFC)-produced reality television series The Ultimate Fighter. This season marked the show's debut on the FX network, the debut of Jon Anik as the show's host, and featured Lightweight fighters.

As part of the deal with FX, the show was revamped. Prior seasons of the show were filmed in six weeks, edited and aired several months after filming was completed. This season the show was being filmed over thirteen weeks and was being edited "the week of" before being broadcast. In addition this season was the first to feature live fights.

The UFC and FX held open tryouts on December 5, 2011, in Las Vegas, Nevada. The casting call went out for Lightweight and Welterweight fighters. Some of the fighters that showed up for the tryouts included UFC veteran Jamie Yager, WEC veteran Blas Avena, and Bellator veterans Rudy Bears, Zak Cummings, and Jacob McClintock, and K-1 kickboxer Kultar Gill.

On December 6, 2011, it was announced that the coaches for the season would be Dominick Cruz and Urijah Faber. They were set to fight for the title, until Cruz's injury on May 7, 2012. The show debuted on March 9, 2012.

Cast

Coaches

 Team Cruz
Dominick Cruz, head coach
Doug Balzarini
Phil Davis, wrestling coach
Eric DelFierro
Lloyd Irvin
Ross Pearson
Wilson Reis
Shanon Slack

 Team Faber
Urijah Faber, head coach
Dustin Akbari
Justin Buchholz
Lance Palmer
Fabio Prado
Thonglor "Master Thong" Armatsena, Muay Thai coach
Danny Castillo
T.J. Dillashaw

Fighters
Team Cruz
 Justin Lawrence, Sam Sicilia, Myles Jury, Mike Rio, James Vick, Vinc Pichel, Chris Tickle, Jeremy Larsen
Team Faber
 Al Iaquinta, Cristiano Marcello, Daron Cruickshank, Joe Proctor, Michael Chiesa, John Cofer, Andy Ogle, Chris Saunders

 Fighters eliminated during the entry round
Akbarh Arreola, Erin Beach, Jared Carlsten, Dakota Cochrane, Drew Dober, Mark Glover, Chase Hackett, James Krause, Austin Lyons, Ali Maclean, Cody Pfister, Jordan Rinaldi, Jeff Smith, Jon Tuck, Brendan Weafer, Johnavan Vistante

Episodes
Episode 1 (March 9, 2012)
 Two days prior to the live episode, the 32 fighters were introduced to Dana White and the two coaches, UFC bantamweight champion Dominick Cruz and Urijah Faber.  White explains that an elimination round will be held and only 16 of the fighters will move on to the Ultimate Fighter house to compete during the rest of the season.  He further explains that the elimination fights will each consist of a single five-minute round.
 The bonus awards are explained:
Fan vote for best fight of the season earns each fighter $25,000.
Fan vote for best submission of the season earns the winner $25,000.
Fan vote for best knock out of the season earns the winner $25,000.
Any fight ending via submission, knock out, or referee stoppage earns the winner $5,000.
The winner of TUF 15 and his coach will also win a Harley Davidson motorcycle.
The winner of TUF 15 will earn a one-year sponsorship deal with Tapout.
The elimination round fights are held:
Joe Proctor defeats Jordan Rinaldi by submission (guillotine choke) at 2:08
Cristiano Marcello defeats Jared Carlsten by submission (rear naked choke) at 2:43.
Sam Sicilia defeats Erin Beach by TKO (strikes) at :08.
Chris Tickle defeats Austin Lyons by TKO (strikes) at :24.
Andy Ogle defeats Brendan Weafer by unanimous decision (10–9, 10–9, 10–9).
Vinc Pichel defeats Cody Pfister by submission (rear naked choke) at 3:39.
John Cofer defeats Mark Glover by unanimous decision (10–9, 10–9, 10–9).
Chris Saunders defeats Chase Hackett by unanimous decision (10–9, 10–9, 10–9).
James Vick defeats Dakota Cochrane by split decision (9–10, 10–9, 10–9).
Michael Chiesa defeats Johnavan Vistante by submission (rear naked choke) at 2:05.
Mike Rio defeats Ali Maclean by submission (rear naked choke) at 3:32.
Justin Lawrence defeats James Krause by TKO (strikes) at 1:25.
Daron Cruickshank defeats Drew Dober by unanimous decision (10–9, 10–9, 10–9).
Jeremy Larsen defeats Jeff Smith by unanimous decision (10–9, 10–9, 10–9).
Al Iaquinta defeats Jon Tuck by unanimous decision (10–9, 10–9, 10–9).
Tuck appeared to break a right toe during the fight.
Myles Jury defeats Akbarh Arreola by unanimous decision (10–9, 10–9, 10–9).

Post Episode 1
The first episode earned a television rating consisting of 1.28 million viewers which was less than the 1.5 million viewers for The Ultimate Fighter: Team Bisping vs. Team Miller.  Following his win in the elimination round, Jeremy Larsen was medically suspended by the Nevada State Athletic Commission (NSAC) due to a cut on his head.  His suspension is scheduled to last until April 9.  However, Keith Kizer, the NSAC Executive Director, said the NSAC and its doctors will evaluate Larsen each week to determine if Larsen can be medically cleared sooner.  Other medical suspensions from the elimination round fights include Jeff Smith (Arachnoid cyst), James Krause (possible ankle injury), Cody Pfister (cut to right eye), Austin Lyons (due to knock out) and Erin Beach (due to technical knock out and cut on lower lip).

 Episode 2: "Embrace the War" (March 16, 2012)
 Saturday 8am: The fighters and coaches are at the UFC training center with White.  White announces that he will flip a coin (red for Cruz, blue for Faber) to pick a coach.  The coach who wins the coin flip will have the option of picking the first fighter or the first fight.  Faber wins the coin flip and decides to pick the first fight.  Cruz makes the first fighter pick and the coaches alternate picking fighters for their teams.

 Saturday 2pm:Faber matches Vick against Cruickshank.
Before the fight announcement, Faber questions Cruz on a comment made in a UFC magazine interview where Cruz mentioned that Faber's family had probably helped him purchase his gym. Faber denies the statement and warns the champion to stay away from family comments. Cruz apologizes before the announcement.
 Sunday 2pm: Michael Chiesa, at the training center, is told to call home and finds out that his father died the day before.  Chiesa talks about his father having been ill and making him promise to stay on the show regardless of what happens.  When Chiesa gets back to the TUF house, he tells Sam Sicilia, whom he knows from home, about his father's death.
 Monday 9am: White meets with Chiesa and says that he can go home for a couple days to be with his family to attend the funeral, and can then rejoin the show afterwards.
 Thursday 4pm: The fighters weigh-in.
 Live: James Vick defeats Daron Cruickshank by KO (knee) at 2:16 of the first round.
Following the fight, Cruz having won control is allowed to make the next fight pick.  From his team, Cruz picks Lawrence, the first overall pick.  Cruz then tells Faber that he can pick anyone from his team to face Lawrence.  Faber hesitates before asking if anyone from his team wants to fight Lawrence.  When no one volunteers, Faber tells Cruz to make the pick for him.  Cruz picks Marcello to face Lawrence in a week's time.

Episode 3: "Old School vs. New School" (March 23, 2012)
Friday 8:15pm: Following the previous week's live episode there is discussion among both teams in regards to the hesitancy on the part of Team Faber to choose someone to face Justin Lawrence.
Sunday 8am:  Chris Tickle, wearing a gas mask, starts this season's prank war by attempting to move Faber's parking sign across the street.  In attempting to do so, he breaks the sign and places it in a pile of tires used inside the UFC training center.
Monday 11am: During the Team Faber training session, Marcello discusses strategy and prepares for his fight against Lawrence.  In response to Tickle's prank, Team Faber puts tape on a large poster of Cruz making him appear like Eddie Munster.
Tuesday 10:30am: John Cofer makes a joke about how Tickle walks.  Tickle gets offended by the joke and a verbal argument ensues.
Tuesday 11am: During the Team Cruz training session, there is a focus for Lawrence on Brazilian jiu jitsu defense.  The prank war also continues as the red team constructs a "thong" for the large poster of Faber, placing it on his "butt chin."
Live: Justin Lawrence defeats Cristiano Marcello by KO (punches) at 3:15 of the second round.
Team Cruz maintains control of the fight pick.  The fight for the following week is announced to be Myles Jury vs. Al Iaquinta, Team Faber's number 1 pick.

Episode 4: "All the Pressure" (March 30, 2012)
Saturday 9am: During Team Cruz practice, Mike Rio tweaks a knee while sparring with Jury.
Sunday 3pm: Various fighters discuss the difficulties of being away from their families for three months without any contact while only being three weeks into the show.
Tuesday 2pm: Faber brings "life coach" Jim Peterson to TUF house to speak with all of the fighters.  Chris Tickle decides not to attend the talk.
Wednesday 8am: Rio is still complaining of pain in his knee.
Live: Al Iaquinta defeats Myles Jury by split decision after three rounds.
Team Faber gains control of the fight pick.  The fight for the following week is announced to be Jeremy Larsen vs. Michael Chiesa.

Post Episode 4
The live fight between Al Iaquinta and Myles Jury went to a third round due to a draw following the first two rounds.  Circumstances surrounding a network commercial break resulted in a three-minute break between the second and third rounds.  Normally, there is only a one-minute break between rounds.  White said in an interview following the episode that the longer breaks can result in fighters starting to cool down or cramp up.  White stated that the UFC and FX will be working on ensuring that extended breaks between rounds does not occur again.

Episode 5: "That Miserable Feeling" (April 6, 2012)
Friday: Following the previous week's live fight and the announcement that Chiesa would be fighting Larsen, Sam Sicilia expresses hesitance to discuss Chiesa's fighting style.  The two are friends and training partners back home and Siclia wants to remain that way and not betray Chiesa.
Saturday 9am: Cruz talks to Sicilia and tries to find out about Chiesa's favorite submissions and fighting style.  Sicilia tells Cruz he is uncomfortable talking about it.
Sunday 9am: Chris Tickle has been complaining of pain in his toes.  In talking with the UFC doctor, the symptoms resemble gout.  The UFC doctor discusses the issue with Cruz and that tests will be performed to verify or eliminate gout as a possibility.  Cruz is not convinced that the problem child is having any real problems and not Tickle disliking the training regimen.  Tickle says it is not the training that he is having a problem with.
Monday 1:30pm: During training, Faber and Chiesa work on takedowns, grappling, and submissions.
Tuesday 3pm: During training, Tickle complains of stomach pains and Cruz tells him to work through them.  In an interview, Cruz explains that he is getting tired of Tickle's excuses not to train.
Wednesday 1pm: Tickle visits the hospital to get the results of the gout tests performed.  The tests have come back negative for gout.
Thursday 4pm: At the official weigh-ins, Larsen weighs  and Chiesa weighs .
Live: Late in the first round, Chiesa kneed Larsen in the head while Larsen had a knee touching the mat.  The referee called for a timeout to allow Larsen to recover from the illegal blow and deducted a point from Chiesa.
Michael Chiesa defeats Jeremy Larsen by unanimous decision after two rounds.
Team Faber retains control of the fight pick.  Faber announces the fight the following week will be between Tickle and Joe Proctor.

Episode 6: "Dog with no Bark" (April 13, 2012)
Friday: It was discussed that Tickle was drunk during the previous week's fight.  In the locker room, Tickle was laughing and making jokes about his just announced fight with Proctor.  Cruz gets upset with Tickle's attitude and tells him to keep his mouth shut for the next week.
Saturday 10:30am: Mike Rio complains of pains in one of his knees and having difficulties moving it.  Rio and Lawrence have a discussion about the lifetime of a mixed martial arts fighter.
During practice, Cruz apologizes to Tickle for his comments the night before.  The head coach explained that he was upset due to Jeremy Larsen's loss. Cruz says he wants Tickle to be himself.
Cruz pairs Justin Lawrence with Rio during practice and tells Lawrence not to throw spin kicks at Rio, although he does.  Rio complains of the kicks feeling they were dangerous for practice.  It causes Rio and Lawrence to become rougher with each other during the training session.  To retaliate, Rio takes Lawrence down and submits him several times.
Saturday 5pm: While Team Faber is at practice, Tickle sets up a practical joke by placing a container of water on the front door to the Ultimate Fighter House.  When Team Faber returns from practice, Proctor walks into the door and the contain of water spills onto his head.  Proctor laughs and believes it is a funny joke.
Sunday 11:30am: The fighters discuss being away from their families and friends during Easter Sunday.  Tickle cooks a turkey for the entire house and the fighters spend time outside with a makeshift Slip 'n Slide.
Thursday 4pm: At the official weigh-ins, Tickle weighs in at  while eating a slice of pizza and Proctor weighs .
Live: Joe Proctor defeats Chris Tickle by submission (rear naked choke) at 4:42 in the first round.
Team Faber retains control of the fight pick.  Faber announces the fight for the following week to be John Cofer against Vinc Pichel.

Episode 7
Vinc Pichel defeats John Cofer by submission (arm triangle choke) at :44 in the third round.

Episode 8
Chris Saunders defeats Sam Sicilia by split decision after two rounds.

Episode 9
 The Coaches' Challenge is presented by White and it is sponsored by the United States Marine Corps.
 The coaches are to climb a 20-foot high rope, shoot five targets with a handgun, flip tractor tires, shoot targets 50 and 70 feet away with an assault rifle, run carrying training dummies, shoot targets with a rifle again, run carrying 35 lbs of ammunition, and shoot a target with a grenade launcher.
 Cruz starts off strong as he was faster to climb the rope, but his rival eventually catches up. Faber is quicker to shoot the target with the grenade launcher and wins the Coaches' Challenge.
Andy Ogle defeats Mike Rio by submission (rear naked choke) at 4:19 in the second round.

Episode 10
James Vick defeats Joe Proctor by unanimous decision after two rounds.
Michael Chiesa defeats Justin Lawrence by TKO (punches) at 1:02 in the third round.
In the last moments of the fight, Chiesa secured a full mount position on Lawrence.

Episode 11
Vinc Pichel defeats Chris Saunders by majority decision after two rounds.
Al Iaquinta defeats Andy Ogle by TKO (punches) at 4:44 in the first round.

Episode 12
Michael Chiesa defeats James Vick by TKO (strikes) at 1:55 in the second round.
Al Iaquinta defeats Vinc Pichel by unanimous decision after two rounds.
The finalists are now announced to be Chiesa and Iaquinta, both of Team Faber.

Episode list

Tournament bracket

Fighters were awarded $25,000 bonuses. Fans chose the winners of the season bonuses.

Fight of the Season: Myles Jury vs. Al Iaquinta
Knockout of the Season: Al Iaquinta
Submission of the Season: Joe Proctor

The Ultimate Fighter 15 Finale

The Ultimate Fighter: Live Finale (also known as The Ultimate Fighter 15 Finale) was a mixed martial arts event to be held by the Ultimate Fighting Championship. It took place on June 1, 2012 at the Palms Casino Resort in Las Vegas, Nevada.

Background
Featured were the finalists from The Ultimate Fighter: Live – Team Cruz vs Team Faber in the Lightweight division.

A rematch between Ian McCall and Demetrious Johnson for the first round of the tournament to crown the first UFC Flyweight Champion was initially reported for this event.  However, it was rescheduled for UFC on FX: Johnson vs. McCall.

Byron Bloodworth was scheduled to face John Albert at the event.  However, Bloodworth was forced out of the bout and replaced by promotional newcomer Érik Pérez.

Results

Bonuses

Fighters were awarded $40,000 bonuses.

Fight of the Night: Justin Lawrence vs. John Cofer
Knockout of the Night: Martin Kampmann and Justin Lawrence
Submission of the Night: Michael Chiesa

Reported payout
The following is the reported payout to the fighters as reported to the Nevada State Athletic Commission. It does not include sponsor money and also does not include the UFC's traditional "fight night" bonuses.
 Martin Kampmann: $84,000 (includes $42,000 win bonus) def. Jake Ellenberger: $42,000
 Michael Chiesa: $16,000 (includes $8,000 win bonus) def. Al Iaquinta: $8,000
 Charles Oliveira: $32,000 (includes $16,000 win bonus) def. Jonathan Brookins: $15,000
 Max Holloway: $12,000 (includes $6,000 win bonus) def. Pat Schilling: $6,000
 Justin Lawrence: $16,000 (includes $8,000 win bonus) def. John Cofer: $8,000
 Daron Cruickshank: $16,000 (includes $8,000 win bonus) def. Chris Tickle: $8,000
 Myles Jury: $16,000 (includes $8,000 win bonus) def. Chris Saunders: $8,000
 Sam Sicilia: $16,000 (includes $8,000 win bonus) def. Christiano Marcello: $8,000
 Joe Proctor: $16,000 (includes $8,000 win bonus) def. Jeremy Larsen: $8,000
 Érik Pérez: $12,000 (includes $6,000 win bonus) def. John Albert: $8,000 ^

^Although not reflected in the NSAC paperwork, both Pérez and Albert received win bonuses

See also
List of UFC events
2012 in UFC

References

2012 in mixed martial arts
The Ultimate Fighter episodes